Nana station is a BTS skytrain station, on the Sukhumvit Line in Khlong Toei and Watthana Districts, Bangkok, Thailand. The station is on Sukhumvit Road at Soi Sukhumvit 9, east of Nana intersection (Soi Sukhumvit 3). It is surrounded by a variety of classes of hotels and facilities for foreign tourists. The red-light district and the Nana Plaza area are also in walking distance from the station.

Facilities
  Tourist information office

See also
 Bangkok Skytrain

BTS Skytrain stations